Isle of Pines may refer to :

 Isle of Pines, the former name for the Isla de la Juventud, Cuba
 Isle of Pines (New Caledonia), an island of New Caledonia
 The Isle of Pines (1668), a book by Henry Neville
 The Island House in Elk Rapids, Michigan (sometimes referred to as the "Isle of Pines")